This Is My Demo is the debut album from British rapper Sway. It was released on 5 February 2006 and produced by Sway for Dcypha Productions. It consists mainly of R&B and British hip hop. The album was critically well received and spent two weeks on the chart, with a peak of number 78. The album was produced by Sway himself along with producers Joe Fields, Terror Danjah, Turkish, Bigz, Ramiz, Tamiz, Big E.D. and Al Shux who produced almost all of the songs, including the single Little Derek.

Track listing 

 Track seven contains a sample of Fleetwood Mac's "The Chain"

This Is My DVD
On some versions of "This Is My Demo" a special DVD was included called "This Is My DVD". The track listing for the DVD is as follows:

 "Flo Fashion"
 "Up Your Speed"
 "Little Derek"
 "Download"
 "Radio 1"
 "On Tour"
 "In The Studio"
 "NYC"
 "Live!"
 "Bonus Track"

Production 
 Sway DaSafo, Al Shux, and Tamiz – track 1
 Sway DaSafo, Al Shux, and Joe Fields – track 2
 Sway DaSafo, Bigz, and Ramiz – track 3
 Sway DaSafo, Al Shux, Ramiz, Joe Fields, and Baby Blue – track 4
 Sway DaSafo and Joe Fields – track 5
 Sway DaSafo and Ramiz – track 6
 Sway DaSafo, D. Watson, L. Buckingham, M. Fleetwood, S. Nicks, C. McVie, J. McVie, and M. Meredith – track 7
 Sway DaSafo, R. Cryce, R. Annor, Big E.D., and Terror Danjah – track 8
 Sway DaSafo, T. Salih, D. Watson, T. Oriola, Haydon, and Turkish – track 9
 Sway DaSafo, Al Shux and M. Pusey – track 10
 Sway DaSafo, Al Shux and Nate James – track 11
 Sway DaSafo, Al Shux, and Joe Fields – track 12
 Sway DaSafo and Al Shux – track 13
 Sway DaSafo and Al Shux – track 14

References

Sway (musician) albums
2006 debut albums
Albums produced by Al Shux